MOS:THEY may refer to:

 Wikipedia:Manual of Style#Second-person pronouns
 Wikipedia:Manual of Style#Gender-neutral language
 Wikipedia:Manual of Style#Identity